Roscoe is a planned light rail and bus rapid transit station in the Los Angeles County Metro Rail system. The station is part of the East San Fernando Light Rail Project and is planned to open in 2028 It is located on Van Nuys Boulevard at the intersection with Roscoe Boulevard in the Panorama City neighborhood of Los Angeles.

References

Future Los Angeles Metro Rail stations
Railway stations scheduled to open in 2028
Panorama City, Los Angeles